ProGet is a package management system, designed by the Inedo software company. It allows users to host and manage personal or enterprise-wide packages, applications, and components.
It was originally designed as a private NuGet (the package manager for the Microsoft development platform) manager and symbol and source server. Beginning in 2015, ProGet has expanded support, added enterprise grade features, and is targeted to fit into a DevOps methodology.
Enterprises utilize ProGet to “package applications and components” with the aim of ensuring software is built only once, and deployed consistently across environments.

The research and advisory company Gartner lists ProGet as a tool aligned to the “Preprod” section of a DevOps toolchain being used to “hold/stage the software ready for release”.

ProGet currently supports a growing list of package managers, including NuGet, Chocolatey, Bower, npm, Maven, PowerShell, RubyGems, Helm for Kubernetes, Debian, Python, and Visual Studio Extensions (.vsix).

ProGet also supports Docker containers, Jenkins build artifacts (through a plugin) and vulnerability scanning.

It is possible to monitor feeds from the ProGet interface; these features are also available to be managed from a number of the clients with which it interfaces.

Features
Some of ProGet's main features include:

 Feed aggregation 
 Connected feed filtering by package or license
 Build/deployment server integration
 Multiple feed support
 Symbol & source server, avoiding the need for a separate symbol server for packages that contain program databases (PDBs)
 Users-based security 
 Integrated LDAP
 Automatic failover 
 Multi-site replication
 Cloud storage, supporting Amazon S3 and Azure Blob package stores
 Deployment records
 Package promotion
 Jenkins CI support
 Vulnerability scanning
 OSS License Filtering 
 Publish directly from Visual Studio
 Webhooks

References

External links
 

Package management systems